The Glasgow and South Western Railway (G&SWR) 403 (or 'Austrian Goods') Class was a class of 2-6-0 (mogul) steam locomotive designed by Peter Drummond, of which 11 were built in 1915 by the North British Locomotive Company at its Queens Park works. Originally built as the 403 class, as a result of renumbering they became known as the 33 Class in 1916 and then 51 Class in 1919, before passing to the London Midland and Scottish Railway (LMS) on its formation in 1923, where they were given power classification 4F.

These freight-traffic locomotives were given the nickname Austrian Goods. The nickname was acquired because when the locomotives were delivered it was rumoured that they had been built from materials that NBL had gathered for a contract for Austria which was cancelled when World War I broke out. However, this rumour was unfounded as the design was entirely Drummond's and there is no evidence of any Austrian contract.

History
The class was a development of Drummond's earlier 279 Class 0-6-0, fitted with superheating, pony trucks and numerous other improvements.  They were far more successful than the 279s, being free-running and remarkably economical in coal and water.  However, there were some reliability problems, notably with the design of the big ends and they were not considered suitable for passenger duties except in emergencies at reduced speed.

The locomotives were initially allocated to the G&SWR's Carlisle Currock shed for goods trains to Glasgow, Greenock, and Ayrshire. Under LMS ownership they were transferred to the former Caledonian Railway shed at Carlisle Kingmoor, after which they were also used on runs over the Caledonian main line and occasionally the Settle-Carlisle Line.  As new LMS 'Crab' 2-6-0s took over their duties in the early 1930s most were displaced from Kingmoor to various LMS sheds throughout Scotland, with some even operating from Inverness for a time.

In addition to their fuel economy, the type had the significant advantage that unlike most G&SWR locomotives it was possible to fit a Caledonian Railway type boiler.  This saved them from being withdrawn by the LMS as non-standard as soon as their boilers became due for replacement. The class, therefore, outlived all other G&SWR tender locomotive types, being withdrawn between 1935 and 1947. All of them were scrapped.

Numbering

References

 
 
 
 
 

2-6-0 locomotives
403
NBL locomotives
Railway locomotives introduced in 1915
Scrapped locomotives
Standard gauge steam locomotives of Great Britain